Shegufta Bakht Chaudhuri (known as S B Chaudhuri; 1931 – 11 November 2020) was a Bangladeshi economist who served as the fourth governor of Bangladesh Bank, the central bank of Bangladesh during 1987–1992, and was also the advisor of the first caretaker government of Bangladesh in 1996.

Background
Shegufta's father was Dewan Mamun Chaudhuri and his paternal grandfather was Khan Bahadur Wasil Chaudhuri. His mother was Syeda Zebunessa Khatun, daughter of Khan Bahadur Syed Sikandar Ali. Writers Syed Mujtaba Ali and Syed Murtaza Ali were Shegufta's maternal uncles. He traced his maternal descent from Shah Ahmed Mutawakkil, a local holy man and a Syed of Taraf, though apparently unrelated to Taraf's ruling Syed dynasty.

Known as Taufiq by his family, Shegufta Bakht Chaudhuri was brought up in his home village of Bongaon, Nabiganj Upazila of Habiganj District in the Division of Sylhet, Bangladesh. He was the eldest of five siblings, having had one younger brother late Mahbubur Rob Sadi and four sisters. S.B. Chaudhuri was known for being an honest and humble man who naturally shied away from the limelight.

Education
He received a BA (Hons) in Economics from the University of Dhaka in the early 1950s. His Masters in International Relations at the same university was not completed due to illness. He later received a MPA (Master of Public Administration) from John F. Kennedy School of Government in 1967.

Career
He was initially a journalist at the Morning News newspaper in the early 1950s before joining the Pakistan Taxation Service in 1955 after completing the CSS examinations. He served in different branches of the Pakistan Government service as a section officer and then as a deputy secretary before he went to attend the Harvard School of Government. He was subsequently employed in a number of roles in the Pakistan and later Bangladesh governments. These include:
First Secretary (Commercial Attaché) at the Pakistan Embassy at Belgrade, Yugoslavia, 1967–70.
Chief Controller of Imports and Exports, Govt. of Pakistan, 1970–71.
Director-General, Export Promotion Bureau, Govt. of Bangladesh for a brief period. 
Chief Controller of Imports and Exports, Govt. of Bangladesh,    1973-1974
Additional Secretary, Ministry of Commerce and Secretary of Internal Resources Division, Ministry of Finance, 1974–77
Chairman, National Board of Revenue, Govt. of Bangladesh, 1981–87
Governor, Bangladesh Bank, 1987–92.

After he retired from Bangladesh Bank, he started a column with the Daily Star titled "Along My Way". He served as an Adviser (the equivalent of a cabinet minister) for three months in the caretaker government of 1996, which ran the country and supervised the parliamentary elections.

Death
Shegufta Bakht Chaudhuri died on 11 November 2020 in Dhaka, Bangladesh. He was survived by his wife late Nargis Chaudhuri, son and daughter as well as three grandchildren and three great-grandchildren.

References

1931 births
2020 deaths
People from Nabiganj Upazila
University of Dhaka alumni
Murari Chand College alumni
20th-century Bangladeshi economists
Governors of Bangladesh Bank
Advisors of Caretaker Government of Bangladesh
Harvard Kennedy School alumni
21st-century Bengalis